The Tees railway viaduct was a railway bridge in the county of Durham, England, which carried the South Durham and Lancashire Union Railway over the River Tees west of Barnard Castle.

History

It was built in 1860 and demolished in 1971. It was designed by the railway's engineer Thomas Bouch, who also designed the ill-fated Tay Bridge, which famously collapsed in 1879, ending his career.

The abutments of the old bridge remained after demolition, and there is now a council-approved proposal to build an  pedestrian suspension rope bridge in its place. The proposed design is similar to the bridge over the River Ébron in France. If completed, it would be the longest bridge of its type in the United Kingdom. This scheme is now unlikely to happen because of a lack of support from the public and landowners who would be affected.

References

Further reading

External links
John Birkbeck Photos - Stainmore Railway includes images of the Tees Viaduct

South Durham and Lancashire Union Railway
Railway viaducts in County Durham
Thomas Bouch
Bridges completed in 1860
Demolished bridges in England
Buildings and structures demolished in 1971